Chinbatyn Otgontsetseg  (born April 30, 1991) is a cross-country skier competing for Mongolia. She competed for Mongolia at the 2014 Winter Olympics in the 10 kilometre classical race. She ended up placing in 70th place in a field of 76 competitors.

Otgontsetseg qualified for the 2018 Winter Olympics.

References

1991 births
Living people
Cross-country skiers at the 2014 Winter Olympics
Cross-country skiers at the 2018 Winter Olympics
Mongolian female cross-country skiers
Olympic cross-country skiers of Mongolia
Asian Games medalists in ski orienteering
Ski-orienteers at the 2011 Asian Winter Games
Asian Games bronze medalists for Mongolia
Medalists at the 2011 Asian Winter Games
Cross-country skiers at the 2017 Asian Winter Games
21st-century Mongolian women